The Clarkson S. Fisher Federal Building and United States Courthouse, originally known as the United States Courthouse and Federal Building, is located in Trenton, Mercer County, New Jersey. It houses the United States District Court for the District of New Jersey.

The building was designed by James A. Wetmore and completed in 1932. The "stripped" Neoclassic structure contains murals by Charles Wells. It was added to the state register of historic places in 1989 and federal register in 2012. It was named for federal judge Clarkson Sherman Fisher in 1993 prior to his death in 1997.

See also
List of United States federal courthouses in New Jersey
National Register of Historic Places listings in Mercer County, New Jersey
Mercer County Courthouse (New Jersey)
Richard J. Hughes Justice Complex

References

External links

Buildings and structures in Trenton, New Jersey
Courthouses in New Jersey
Government buildings completed in 1932
Government buildings on the National Register of Historic Places in New Jersey
Neoclassical architecture in New Jersey
Art Deco architecture in New Jersey
National Register of Historic Places in Trenton, New Jersey
New Jersey Register of Historic Places
Courthouses on the National Register of Historic Places in New Jersey